David B. Heller (born 1968) is an American businessman, former Goldman Sachs executive, and minority owner in the Philadelphia Sixers.

Biography
In 1989, Heller received a B.A. from Harvard University with a concentration in American history. After school, he joined Goldman Sachs as a trader in Equity Derivatives. In 1993, he moved to Tokyo to become head of Volatility Trading and the co-head of Equities in Japan. In 1999, he transferred to London as head of Global Trading for Equity Derivatives. In 2006, he returned to New York City as global head of Equities Trading. In 2008, he was named global co-head of the Securities Division. In 2012, he retired from Goldman Sachs but will continue on as a senior director of the company.

Heller is a member of the investment group that won a $280 million bid for the purchase of the Philadelphia Seventy-Sixers. The other members of the investment group are: Joshua Harris of the private equity firm Apollo Global Management, portfolio manager Art Wrubel, former NBA agent, Sacramento Kings executive Jason Levien,  David S. Blitzer of the Blackstone Group, former Vail Resorts CEO Adam Aron, Martin J. Geller, Travis Hennings, James Lassiter, Marc Leder, Michael Rubin, Will Smith & Jada Pinkett Smith, and Indonesian businessmen Handy Soetedjo & Erick Thohir. Comcast-Spectacor and Harris began talks in the summer of 2011.  The deal was announced on July 13, 2011.  The NBA formally approved the deal on October 13.

Heller serves on the boards of Acumen Fund, The New Museum of Contemporary Art, Project Morry and the  public policy institute, the Third Way.

Personal life
Heller lives in New York with his wife and three children.

References

1968 births
American business executives
American financiers
Goldman Sachs people
Harvard University alumni
Living people
Philadelphia 76ers owners